Fars Province, is one of the provinces of Iran. The Fars Province is in the south of the Iran and its capital city is Shiraz .

 Shiraz University
 Shiraz University of Medical Sciences
 Shiraz University of Technology
 Islamic Azad University of Shiraz
 Jahrom University
 Jahrom University of Medical Sciences
 Islamic Azad University of Jahrom
 Payam Noor University of Shiraz
 Payam Noor University of Jahrom
 Shiraz University of Applied Science and Technology
 Shahid Bahonar College of Technology and Engineering of Shiraz
 Hafez Institute of Higher Education
 Zand Institute of Higher Education
 Honar Institute of Higher Education
 Earm Institute of Higher Education
 Pasargad Institute of Higher Education
 Fasa University of Medical Sciences
 Fasa University
 Islamic Azad University, Fars Science and Research Branch
 Islamic Azad University of Abadeh
 Islamic Azad University of Arsanjan
 Islamic Azad University of Beiza
 Islamic Azad University of Darab
 Islamic Azad University of Eghlid
 Islamic Azad University of Sepidan
 Islamic Azad University of Fasa
 Islamic Azad University of Firouzabad
 Islamic Azad University of Estahban
 Islamic Azad University of Eghlid
 Islamic Azad University of Kazerun
 Islamic Azad University of Larestan
 Islamic Azad University of Lamerd
 Islamic Azad University of Eghlid
 Islamic Azad University of Marvdasht
 Islamic Azad University of Neyriz
 Islamic Azad University of Abadeh Tashk
 Islamic Azad University of Mamasani ( Noorabad )
 Islamic Azad University of Mohr
 Islamic Azad University of Daryoon
 Islamic Azad University of Farashband
 Islamic Azad University of Evaz
 Islamic Azad University of Safa Shahr
 Islamic Azad University of Sarvestan
 Islamic Azad University of Gerash
 Islamic Azad University of Khafr
 Islamic Azad University of Khonj
 Islamic Azad University of Kavar
 Islamic Azad University of Kherameh
 Islamic Azad University of Pasargod
 Islamic Azad University of Zarghan
 Islamic Azad University of Zarrindasht

See also
 List of universities in Iran
 Fars Province
 List of Iranian Medical Schools
 List of Universities in Tehran Province
List of colleges and universities in Tehran
 List of Iranian Research Centers
 List of colleges and universities by country
 List of colleges and universities
 Higher education in Iran

References
 https://web.archive.org/web/20120601161232/http://www.iauro.ac.ir/fa/

External links 

 Province of Fars on Iran Chamber Society
 Fars Tourist Attractions
 Cultural Heritage Foundation of Fars Province

Fars Province, List of universities in
Universities
Buildings and structures in Fars Province